Henry Walvoord (November 14, 1847 – August 9, 1909) was an American farmer and politician.

Born in Pittsburgh, Pennsylvania, Walvoord moved with his family to Cedar Grove, Sheboygan County, Wisconsin,  in 1849. Walvoord was a dairy farmer and was in the pea canning business. He served on the town board and was chairman of the board. He also served on the Sheboygan County Board of Supervisors and was the county treasurer and register of deeds. In 1885, he served in the Wisconsin State Assembly as a Republican. In 1909, he died suddenly at his home in Cedar Grove, Wisconsin.

Notes

1847 births
1909 deaths
Politicians from Pittsburgh
People from Cedar Grove, Wisconsin
Farmers from Wisconsin
Wisconsin city council members
Mayors of places in Wisconsin
County supervisors in Wisconsin
Republican Party members of the Wisconsin State Assembly
19th-century American politicians